Lapland is the largest and northernmost region of Finland. The 21 municipalities in the region cooperate in a Regional Council. Lapland borders the region of North Ostrobothnia in the south. It also borders the Gulf of Bothnia, Norrbotten County in Sweden, Troms and Finnmark County in Norway, and Murmansk Oblast and the Republic of Karelia in Russia. Topography varies from vast mires and forests of the South to fells in the North. The Arctic Circle crosses Lapland, so polar phenomena such as the midnight sun and polar night can be viewed in Lapland.

Lapland's cold and wintry climate, coupled with its relative abundance of conifer trees such as pines and spruces, means that it has become associated with Christmas in some countries, most notably the United Kingdom, and holidays to Lapland are common towards the end of the year. However, the Lapland region has developed its infrastructure for year-round tourism. For example, in the 2019 snow-free period tourism grew more than in the winter season. Rovaniemi is the main regional centre of Lapland, and the Rovaniemi Airport is the third busiest airport in Finland. Besides tourism, other important sectors are trade, manufacturing and construction. Like Rovaniemi, Inari is also one of the most important tourist destinations in Lapland for foreign tourism.

Lapland has been connected with the legendary "North Pole" home of Santa Claus (Father Christmas or Saint Nicholas) since 1927, when Finnish radio host Markus Rautio said that Santa Claus lived on Korvatunturi, a fell (mountain) in the region. Later, Rovaniemi staked a claim as Santa's "official hometown" and developed the Santa Claus Village attraction to encourage tourism.

Geography
The area of the Lapland region is 100,367 km², which consists of 92,667 km² of dry land, 6,316 km² fresh water and 1,383 km² of seawater. In the south it borders the Northern Ostrobothnia region, in the west Sweden, in the north and west Norway and in east Russia. Its borders follow three rivers: Tana, Muonio and Torne. The largest lake is Lake Inari, 1,102 km². Highest point is on Halti, which reaches 1,324 m (4,344 ft) on the Finnish side of the border.

The areas of Enontekiö and Utsjoki in northern Lapland are known as Fell-Lapland. The bulk and remaining Lapland is known as Forest-Lapland. Lake Inari, the many fens of the region and the Salla-Saariselkä mountains are all part of Forest-Lapland. Fell-Lapland lies in the fells of the Scandinavian Mountains. It is not made up of barren ground like blockfields but instead has the vegetation of birch forests, willow thickets or heath. Common soil types in Forest-Lapland are till and sand with conifer forests growing on top. These forests show little variation across Lapland. Compared to southern Finland forest tree species grow slower. Understory is typically made of blueberries, lichens, crowberries and lings.  

The landscape of large parts of Lapland is an inselberg plain. It has been suggested the inselberg plains were formed in the Late Cretaceous or Paleogene period by pediplanation or etchplanation. Relative to southern Finland Lapland stands out for its thick till cover. The hills and mountains are typically made up of resistant rocks like granite, gneiss, quartzite and amphibolite. The ice sheet that covered Finland intermittently during the Quaternary grew out from the Scandinavian Mountains. The central parts of the Fennoscandian ice sheet had cold-based conditions during times of maximum extent. This means that in areas like northeast Sweden and northern Finland, pre-existing landforms and deposits escaped glacier erosion and are particularly well preserved at present. Northwest to the southeast movement of the ice has left a field of aligned drumlins in central Lapland. Ribbed moraines found in the same area reflects a later west-to-east change in the movement of the ice. During the last deglaciation ice in Lapland retreated from the north-east, east and southeast so that the lower course of the Tornio was the last part of Finland to be deglaciated 10,100 years ago. Present-day periglacial conditions in Lapland are reflected in the existence of numerous palsas, permafrost landforms developed on peat.

The bedrock of Lapland belongs to the Karelian Domain occupying the bulk of the region, the Kola Domain in the northeast around Lake Inari and the Scandinavian Caledonides in the tip of Lapland's northwestern arm. With few exceptions rocks are of Archean and Proterozoic age. Granites, gneiss, metasediments and metavolcanics are common rocks while greenstone belts are recurring features. More rare rock associations include mafic and ultramafic layered intrusions and one of the world's oldest ophiolites. The region hosts valuable deposits of gold, chromium, iron and phosphate.

Climate

The very first snowflakes fall to the ground in late August or early September over the higher peaks. The first ground-covering snow arrives on average in October or late September. Permanent snow cover comes between mid-October and the end of November, significantly earlier than in southern Finland. The winter is long, approximately seven months. The snow cover is usually thickest in early April. Soon after that the snow cover starts to melt fast. The thickest snow cover ever was measured in Kilpisjärvi on 19 April 1997 and it was 190 cm. The annual mean temperature varies from a couple of degrees below zero in the northwest to a couple of degrees above zero in the southwest (Kemi-Tornio area). Lapland exhibits a trend of increasing precipitation towards the south, with the dryest parts being located at the two arms.

In summer months, the average temperature is consistently over 10°C. Heat waves with daily temperatures exceeding 25°C occur on an average of 5-10 days per summer in northern Finland.

History

The area of Lapland was split between two counties of the Swedish Realm from 1634 to 1809. The northern and western areas were part of Västerbotten County, while the southern areas (so-called Peräpohjola) were part of Ostrobothnia County (after 1755 Oulu County). The northern and western areas were transferred in 1809 to Oulu County, which became Oulu Province. Under the royalist constitution of Finland during the first half of 1918, Lapland was to become a Grand Principality and part of the inheritance of the proposed king of Finland. Lapland Province was separated from Oulu Province in 1938.

During the Interim Peace and beginning of the Continuation War the government of Finland allowed the Nazi German Army to station itself in Lapland as a part of Operation Barbarossa. After Finland made a separate peace with the Soviet Union in 1944, the Soviet Union demanded that Finland expel the German army from its soil. The result was the Lapland War, during which almost the whole civilian population of Lapland was evacuated. Ninety per cent of Rovaniemi, the capital of Lapland, was burned to the ground, with only a few pre-war buildings surviving the destruction.

After the Second World War, Petsamo municipality and part of Salla municipality were ceded to the Soviet Union. The decades following the war were a period of rebuilding, industrialisation and fast economic growth. Large hydroelectric plants and mines were established and cities, roads and bridges were rebuilt after the destruction of the war. In the late 20th century the economy of Lapland started to decline, mines and factories became unprofitable and the population started to decline rapidly across most of the region.

The provinces of Finland were abolished on 1 January 2010, but Lapland was reorganised as one of the new regions that replaced them.

Economy

Tourism

Population
Lapland is the home of about 3.4% of Finland's total population and is by far the least densely populated area in the country. The biggest towns in Lapland are Rovaniemi (the regional capital), Tornio, and Kemi. In 2011, Lapland had a population of 183,320 of whom 177,950 spoke Finnish, 1,526 spoke Sami, 387 spoke Swedish and 3,467 spoke some other languages as their mother tongue.  Of the Sami languages, Northern Sami, Inari Sami and Skolt Sami are spoken in the region. Pelkosenniemi is the smallest municipality in mainland Finland in terms of population, while Savukoski is sparsely populated in terms of population density.

Lapland's population has been in decline since 1990.

Regional Council
The 21 municipalities of Lapland are organised into a single Region, where they cooperate in the Lapland Regional Council, Lapin liitto or Lapplands förbund.

Politics
Lapland has seven seats in the 200-seat parliament of Finland. In the 2019 Finnish parliamentary election, three seats went to Centre Party, and the Finns Party, the Left Alliance, the Social Democratic Party and the National Coalition Party got one seat each.

The votes were distributed as follows:
Centre Party 29.20%
Finns Party 17.19%
Left Alliance 14.16%
Social Democratic Party 13.51%
National Coalition Party 11.26%
Green League 9.72%
Movement Now 1.99%
Christian Democrats 1.08%
Seven Star Movement 0.67%
Blue Reform 0.48%
Swedish People's Party 0.11%
Other parties 0.63%

Sami Domicile Area

The northernmost municipalities of Lapland where the Sámi people are the most numerous form the Sami Domicile Area. Sami organisation exists in parallel with the provincial one.

Municipalities

The region of Lapland is made up of 21 municipalities, of which four have city status (marked in bold).

Transport

Roads
Three European roads pass through Lapland: E8, E63 and E75, the latter of which runs almost 600 kilometres from the southernmost municipality of Simo to the northernmost municipality of Utsjoki.

Airports
Kemi-Tornio, Rovaniemi, Kittilä, Ivalo and Enontekiö airports are located in Lapland. The flight time from Helsinki is about 1,5 hours.

Railways
In the western part, the Laurila–Kelloselkä railway runs from Tornio to Kolari, and the eastern line runs from Keminmaa via Rovaniemi and Kemijärvi to the eastern border of the country at Salla's Kelloselkä.

See also
Finnish Lakeland
Lääni
Laponia (historical province of Finland)
Lappmarken
National parks in Lapland
Sea Lapland
Southern Lapland

Notes

References

External links

Lapland Regional Council – Official site
House of Lapland
Lapland State Provincial Office – Official site
Lapland Club
Kemi-Tornio University of Applied Sciences – video portal – Videos about Lapland experiences and lifestyle.
Levi-Lapland –  Information on Lapland, the ski resorts and the Lapland Super Pass.
Where is Lapland?
Midnight Sun Film Festival

 
Sápmi
Regions of Finland
Provinces of Finland (1917–97)
Provinces of Finland (1997–2009)
States and territories established in 1936
1936 establishments in Finland